Darnileh-ye Eskandar (also Romanized as Dārnīleh-ye Eskandar; also known as Dār-e Nīlehgār) is a village in Ozgoleh Rural District, Ozgoleh District, Salas-e Babajani County, Kermanshah Province, Iran. At the 2006 census, its population was 27, in 6 families.

References 

Populated places in Salas-e Babajani County